Mürsel Bakû (1881; Erzurum – 2 February 1945; Istanbul) was an officer of the Ottoman Army and a general of the Turkish Army. Following the defeat of the Ottoman Empire in World war I, he was arrested in January 1919, prosecuted for war crimes and deported to Malta as one of the Malta Exiles. After his return from detention in Malta, he was the general of the Seventh Army, which took part in the defense of Diyarbakır during the Sheikh Said Rebellion in 1924–1925.

See also
List of high-ranking commanders of the Turkish War of Independence

Sources

1881 births
1945 deaths
People from Erzurum
People from Erzurum vilayet
Ottoman Military Academy alumni
Ottoman Military College alumni
Ottoman Army officers
Ottoman military personnel of the Balkan Wars
Ottoman military personnel of World War I
Ottoman prisoners of war
World War I prisoners of war held by the United Kingdom
Malta exiles
Turkish military personnel of the Greco-Turkish War (1919–1922)
Recipients of the Medal of Independence with Red Ribbon (Turkey)
Turkish Army generals
Deputies of Kocaeli
Burials at Turkish State Cemetery
Turkish people of Circassian descent